The 2013 FIA World Endurance Championship season was the second season of the FIA World Endurance Championship auto racing series, co-organized by the Fédération Internationale de l'Automobile (FIA) and the Automobile Club de l'Ouest (ACO). The series was open to Le Mans Prototypes and grand tourer-style racing cars meeting four ACO categories. World Championships were awarded to drivers and to LMP1 category manufacturers, and several World Cups and Endurance Trophies were awarded for the series' other categories. The eight race championship began in April at the Silverstone Circuit and ended in November at the Bahrain International Circuit. The season was marred by the death of Allan Simonsen in the 24 Hours of Le Mans.

Calendar
An initial calendar was published by the FIA World Motor Sport Council on 28 September 2012. Seven of the eight races on the schedule are carried over from 2012, although several events have had their dates changed. The 6 Hours of Silverstone now begins the season in April before Spa in May and the 24 Hours of Le Mans in June. In order to save costs and utilize shipping by sea instead of air, the non-European events have all been grouped at the end of the season. São Paulo remains as the first post-European event, while the new 6 Hours of Circuit of the Americas replaces the 12 Hours of Sebring as the American round of the series. Fuji and Shanghai are moved forward on the calendar, leaving Bahrain to now close the season in November, allowing cooler temperatures than its September date in 2012.

The Silverstone race weekend was shared with the European Le Mans Series, while the Austin weekend was held in conjunction with the American Le Mans Series, although unlike the 2012 12 Hours of Sebring, both series ran separate races.

Regulation changes
An additional World Cup was awarded for the 2013 season, with drivers in both LMGTE categories having a unified championship. Further, the LMP2 and LMGTE Am categories had FIA Endurance Trophies awarded for their drivers. The qualifying format of the race weekend was also changed, with teams requiring two drivers each to set two timed laps. The qualifying results were determined based on an average of the four total laps. The new qualifying format has been met with much criticism from drivers. The pre-race warm-up session has also been eliminated from the series, except in instances where extra practice may be necessary.

The LMP2 category saw several rule changes in order to lower costs, including the issuing of balance of performance updates during the course of the season. A limit was also set on the price of upgrade kits for 2012 cars for teams not purchasing 2013 chassis, while the number of engines and tyres they can utilize over the course of the season have been restricted. Diesel engines were allowed in the LMP2 category for the first time. Limits on tyres were also set in the LMGTE Am category.

Entries
The World Endurance Championship received entries in four classes, including Le Mans Prototype 1 (LMP1), Le Mans Prototype 2 (LMP2), Le Mans Grand Touring Endurance — Professional (LMGTE Pro) and Le Mans Grand Touring Endurance — Amateur (LMGTE Am). The entry list for the 2013 season was released by the Automobile Club de l'Ouest on 1 February, and included six LMP1 and twelve LMP2 cars, six LMGTE Pro entries, and eight LMGTE Am cars, bringing the full grid up to thirty-two entrants.  Two LMP2 teams, Starworks Motorsport and HVM Status GP later withdrew their full-season entries citing a lack of funding.

LMP1

LMP2

LMGTE Pro

LMGTE Am

Results and standings

Race results
The highest finishing competitor entered in the World Endurance Championship is listed below.  Invitational entries may have finished ahead of WEC competitors in individual races.

Entries are required to complete the timed race as well as to complete 70% of the overall winning car's race distance in order to earn championship points.  A single bonus point is awarded to the team and all drivers of the pole position car for each category in qualifying.  For the 24 Hours of Le Mans, the race result points allocation was doubled.  Due to the 6 Hours of Fuji not completing 75% of the race time, half points were awarded in all championships.

Drivers Championships
Four titles are awarded to drivers in the 2013 season. A World Championship is reserved for LMP1 and LMP2 drivers. A World Cup is available for drivers in the LMGTE categories. Further, two FIA Endurance Trophies are also awarded to drivers in the LMP2 and LMGTE Am categories.

FIA World Endurance Championship — Drivers
Allan McNish, Tom Kristensen and Loïc Duval won the Championship at the 6 Hours of Shanghai.

FIA World Endurance Cup for GT Drivers
Gianmaria Bruni won the FIA World Endurance Cup for GT Drivers at the 6 Hours of Bahrain.

FIA Endurance Trophy for LMP2 Drivers
Bertrand Baguette, Martin Plowman and Ricardo González earned the Trophy for LMP2 Drivers at the 6 Hours of Bahrain.

FIA Endurance Trophy for LMGTE Am Drivers
Jamie Campbell-Walter and Stuart Hall secured the Trophy for LMGTE Am Drivers at the 6 Hours of Bahrain.

Manufacturers' Championships
Two manufacturers' championships are held in the FIA WEC, one for sports prototypes and one for grand tourers. The World Manufacturers' Championship is only open to manufacturer entries in the LMP1 category, and points are only awarded to the highest scoring entry from each manufacturer for each event. The World Cup for GT Manufacturers allows entries from both LMGTE Pro and LMGTE Am to participate, and allows the top two finishing cars from each manufacturer to earn points toward their total.  Audi secured their second consecutive World Manufacturers' Championship at the 6 Hours of Fuji. Ferrari won their second consecutive World Cup at the 6 Hours of Bahrain.

FIA World Endurance Championship — Manufacturers

FIA World Endurance Cup for GT Manufacturers

Teams Championships
Teams in each of the four FIA WEC categories are eligible for their own FIA Endurance Trophies.  Each car is scored separately, unlike 2012 in which team results were combined.

FIA Endurance Trophy for Private LMP1 Teams
The FIA Endurance Trophy for Private LMP1 Teams was open only to private teams competing in LMP1 without manufacturer support. Following Strakka Racing's withdrawal mid-season, Rebellion Racing were the only team to complete the championship.

FIA Endurance Trophy for LMP2 Teams

The Trophy for LMP2 Teams was won by the No. 35 car of OAK Racing at the 6 Hours of Bahrain.

FIA Endurance Trophy for LMGTE Pro Teams
The Trophy for LMGTE Pro Teams was won by the No. 51 car of AF Corse at the 6 Hours of Bahrain.

FIA Endurance Trophy for LMGTE Am Teams
The No. 81 car of 8 Star Motorsports won the Trophy for LMGTE Am Teams at the 6 Hours of Bahrain.

References

External links

 
 2013 FIA World Endurance Championship Sporting Regulations (www.fia.com); archived at www.webcitation.org on 2 August 2013
 2013 FIA World Endurance Championship Classifications (www.fia.com); archived at www.webcitation.org on 16 December 2013

World Endurance Championship
 
FIA World Endurance Championship seasons